Eulepidotis nicaea is a moth of the family Erebidae first described by Herbert Druce in 1900. It is found in the Neotropics, including Colombia.

References

Moths described in 1900
nicaea